Tătulești is a commune in Olt County, Muntenia, Romania. It is composed of six villages: Bărbălăi, Lunca, Măgura, Mircești, Momaiu and Tătulești.

References

Communes in Olt County
Localities in Muntenia